District 83 is a district in the Texas House of Representatives. Following 2021 redistricting, the district represents the entirety of the following counties: Borden, Crosby, Dickens, Floyd, Garza, Kent, Lynn, Mitchell, Scurry, and Terry. In addition, the district represents a portion of Lubbock County. Since 2014, it has been represented by Republican Dustin Burrows.

Representatives

References

083
Borden County, Texas
Crosby County, Texas
Dickens County, Texas
Floyd County, Texas
Garza County, Texas
Kent County, Texas
Lynn County, Texas
Mitchell County, Texas
Scurry County, Texas
Terry County, Texas